Downer is an unincorporated community in Clay County, Minnesota, United States.

The community is located between Moorhead and Barnesville at the junction of Minnesota State Highway 9 and County Road 10 (90th Avenue South). Interstate 94/U.S. Highway 52 is nearby.

History
Downer contained a post office from 1886 until 1954. The community was named by the railroad.

References

Unincorporated communities in Minnesota
Unincorporated communities in Clay County, Minnesota